This is a general list of musicals, including Broadway, Off-Broadway, and West End musicals, as well as film and television musicals, whose titles fall into the A–L alphabetic range.

0–9

A

B

C

D

E

F

G

H

I

J

K

L

See also
 List of musicals: M to Z
 List of notable musical theatre productions
 List of operettas
 List of Bollywood films
 List of rock musicals

Notes

References

 
Musicals: A to L
A to L